The 2022–23 Wofford Terriers men's basketball team represented Wofford College in the 2022–23 NCAA Division I men's basketball season. The Terriers, led by interim head coach Dwight Perry, played their home games at Jerry Richardson Indoor Stadium in Spartanburg, South Carolina as a member of the Southern Conference. On December 30, 4th-year head coach Jay McAuley resigned, after being on a leave of absence since December 5. Assistant coach Dwight Perry served as the interim head coach for the remainder of the season.

Previous season
The Terriers finished the 2021–22 season 19–13, 10–8 in SoCon play to finish in a tie for third place. In the SoCon tournament, they defeated VMI in the quarterfinals, before falling to Chattanooga in the semifinals. They were invited to participate in The Basketball Classic, but were forced to withdraw, due to a "variety of logistical factors".

Roster

Schedule and results

|-
!colspan=12 style=| Non-conference regular season

|-
!colspan=12 style=| SoCon regular season

|-
!colspan=12 style=| SoCon tournament

Sources

References

Wofford Terriers men's basketball seasons
Wofford Terriers
Wofford Terriers men's basketball
Wofford Terriers men's basketball